General Charles Thomas "Tony" Robertson Jr. (born August 15, 1946) is a retired United States Air Force general who served as commander in chief, United States Transportation Command, and commander, Air Mobility Command, Scott Air Force Base, Illinois. As commander, he was responsible for the nation's defense transportation requirements.

Background
Raised in South Carolina, Robertson graduated from the United States Air Force Academy in 1968. During his 33-year career he has held a variety of operational and staff positions, including command at the squadron, wing and numbered air force levels. In previous assignments he served as director, personnel plans, Headquarters United States Air Force; vice director, the Joint Staff, Joint Chiefs of Staff; vice commander, Air Mobility Command, and commander, Fifteenth Air Force. A command pilot, he has logged 4,700 hours in airlift, tanker and bomber aircraft, including 150 combat missions as a gunship pilot in Vietnam. Robertson retired on December 1, 2001.

Education
1968 Bachelor of Science degree in engineering science, United States Air Force Academy, Colorado Springs, Colorado
1975 Squadron Officer School, Maxwell Air Force Base, Alabama
1977 Master's degree in industrial management, Central Michigan University
1985 National War College, Fort Lesley J. McNair, Washington, D.C.
1994 National and International Security Program, John F. Kennedy School of Government, Harvard University, Cambridge, Massachusetts

Assignments
August 1968 – August 1969, student, undergraduate pilot training, 3550th Student Squadron, Moody Air Force Base, Georgia
April 1970 – April 1971, AC-119K gunship pilot, 18th Special Operations Squadron, Da Nang Air Base, South Vietnam
May 1971 – June 1974, B-52H co-pilot, aircraft commander, instructor pilot and flight examiner, 17th Bombardment Wing, Wright-Patterson Air Force Base, Ohio
August 1974 – October 1975, assistant to the chief of staff, Headquarters Strategic Air Command, Offutt Air Force Base, Nebraska
October 1975 – August 1977, aide and executive officer to the vice commander in chief, Headquarters Strategic Air Command, Offutt Air Force Base, Nebraska
August 1977 – March 1980, FB-111A commander, flight commander and assistant operations officer, 528th Bomb Squadron, Plattsburgh Air Force Base, New York
March 1980 – May 1982, plans and programming officer, Strategic Forces Division, Directorate of Programs and Evaluation, Deputy Chief of Staff for Programs and Resources, Headquarters U.S. Air Force, the Pentagon, Washington, D.C.
May 1982 – June 1984, FB-111A commander, 529th Bomb Squadron, later, assistant deputy commander for maintenance, 380th Bombardment Wing, Plattsburgh Air Force Base, New York
June 1984 – July 1985, student, National War College, Fort Lesley J. McNair, Washington, D.C.
July 1985 – June 1986, executive officer to the Air Force vice chief of staff, Headquarters U.S. Air Force, the Pentagon, Washington, D.C.
June 1986 – July 1987, assistant for general officer matters, Deputy Chief of Staff, Personnel, Headquarters U.S. Air Force, Washington, D.C.
July 1987 – January 1989, vice commander, later, commander, 2nd Bombardment Wing, Barksdale Air Force Base, Louisiana
January 1989 – January 1990, commander, 384th Bombardment Wing, McConnell Air Force Base, Kansas
January 1990 – August 1991, assistant deputy chief of staff, Plans and Resources, Headquarters Strategic Air Command, Offutt Air Force Base, Nebraska
August 1991 – June 1993, director, Personnel Plans, Deputy Chief of Staff for Personnel, Headquarters U.S. Air Force, the Pentagon, Washington, D.C.
June 1993 – June 1995, vice director, the Joint Staff, Joint Chiefs of Staff, the Pentagon, Washington, D.C.
June 1995 – September 1996, vice commander, Air Mobility Command, Scott Air Force Base, Illinois
September 1996 – July 1998, commander, Fifteenth Air Force, Travis Air Force Base, California
August 1998 – December 2001, commander in chief, United States Transportation Command, and commander, Air Mobility Command, Scott Air Force Base, Illinois

Flight information
Rating: Command pilot, parachutist
Flight hours: 4,700
Aircraft flown: AC-119K, B-1B, B-2, B-52, C-5, C-9, C-17, C-20B, C-21, C-37, C-130, C-141, EC-135, FB-111A, KC-10, KC-135, T-1, T-6, T-37, T-38 and T-39

Awards and decorations

References

External links

1946 births
Living people
People from Charlotte, North Carolina
United States Air Force Academy alumni
Military personnel from South Carolina
United States Air Force personnel of the Vietnam War
Recipients of the Air Medal
Recipients of the Distinguished Flying Cross (United States)
Central Michigan University alumni
Harvard Kennedy School alumni
Recipients of the Legion of Merit
United States Air Force generals
Recipients of the Order of the Sword (United States)
Recipients of the Air Force Distinguished Service Medal
Recipients of the Defense Distinguished Service Medal
People from Pineville, North Carolina